Domunli is a town in the Western Region of Ghana. The town is south of Agufo on the Atlantic coast of Ghana. The town is the site of a 900 megawatts of electric power plant for Ghana. The power plant is managed by the Domunli Gas Processing Project.

Other towns that surround Domunli include Domun, Ejan, Dentokrom.

References

Populated places in Jomoro Municipal District